English Evenings were a British new wave and synth-pop duo that formed in 1983. They released their sole studio album, After Dark, in 1985 but it was not a commercial success, and after a subsequent single a year later that also failed to make any commercial impact they broke up.

History
Before English Evenings, Lee Walsh was a member of the band Sly Fox, whose name later changed to One Adult. After the band broke up and with its members going their separate ways, Walsh secured a record deal under the name of English Evenings, together with bandmate Graham Lee. They released only one album in 1985, on the UK independent label Safari Records. Although their producer was the famous audio engineer and producer Phil Harding, they did not meet with much success.

After disbanding, Graham Lee and Lee Walsh went on to later produce a football song for Leeds United in 1990, entitled "We Are Leeds".

Discography

Albums
1985: After Dark

Singles
1983: "What's the Matter with Helen?"/"English Evenings"
1984: "Touch"
1984: "Tear You Down"
1985: "I Will Return"
1986: "Those Brilliant Teens"

References

External links
 

English new wave musical groups
English musical duos
Musical groups established in 1983
British synth-pop new wave groups
Male musical duos
New wave duos
Warner Music Group artists